The First Shadow Cabinet of Antonis Samaras was formed in 2009. A reshuffle was made in 2011. Following the June 2012 Greek legislative election, the Cabinet of Antonis Samaras was formed. The Shadow Cabinet of Alexis Tsipras became the next Shadow Cabinet.

Formation

The Shadow Cabinet was formed in December 2009, following the 2009 Greek legislative election. There was a "radical" cabinet reshuffle in January 2011. The Shadow Cabinet was dissolved following the May 2012 Greek legislative election, as there was no official opposition to the Caretaker Cabinet of Panagiotis Pikrammenos. Following the ND-PASOK-DIMAR coalition after the June 2012 Greek legislative election, the Cabinet of Antonis Samaras was formed, and the Shadow Cabinet of Alexis Tsipras became the next Shadow Cabinet.

Shadow Cabinet composition

 Leader of the Opposition and Leader of New Democracy – Antonis Samaras
 Shadow Minister for Foreign Affairs – Dimitris Avramopoulos
 Shadow Minister of Finance – Antonis Samaras
 Shadow Deputy Minister of Finance for Economic Policy - Christos Staikouras
 Shadow Deputy Minister of Finance for Taxation - Theodoros Karaoglou
 Shadow Development and Competitiveness Minister – Kostis Chatzidakis
 Shadow Labour and Social Solidary Minister – Yiannis Vroutsi
 Shadow Public Administration Minister – Christos Zois
 Shadow Minister for Citizen Protection and Justice Minister – Nikos Dendias
 Shadow Minister for National Defence – Costas Tasoulas
 Shadow Environment Minister - Kyriakos Mitsotakis
 Shadow Minister for Education and Religious Affairs - Eliza Vozemberg
 Shadow Energy Minister - Mihalis Yiannakis
 Shadow Tourism Minister - Olga Kefalogianni
 Shadow Agriculture Minister - George Kasapidis
 Shadow Merchant Marine Minister - Yiannis Plakiotakis
 Parliamentary Representative - Costas Tzavaras
 Party Spokesperson – Panos Panagiotopoulos

References:

2011 reshuffle

 Leader of the Opposition and Leader of New Democracy – Antonis Samaras
 Shadow Minister for Foreign Affairs – Panos Panagiotopoulos
 Shadow Alternate Minister for Foreign Affairs - Costas Gioulekas
 Shadow Minister of Finance – Antonis Samaras
 Shadow Alternate Minister of Finance - Christos Staikouras
 Shadow Alternate Minister of Finance - Notis Mitarachi
 Shadow Alternate Minister of Finance - Yiannis Vroutsis
 Shadow Minister for the Interior
 Shadow Development and Competitiveness Minister – Kostis Chatzidakis
 Shadow Labour and Social Solidary Minister – Yiannis Vroutsi
 Shadow Public Administration Minister – Christos Zois
 Shadow Minister for Citizen Protection – Thanassis Nakos
 Shadow Minister for National Defence – Margaritis Tzimas
 Shadow Environment Minister - Kyriakos Mitsotakis
 Shadow Alternate Environment Minister - Nicos Kanteres
 Shadow Alternate Environment Minister - Theodora Avgerinopoulou
 Shadow Energy Minister - Mihalis Yiannakis
 Shadow Tourism Minister - Olga Kefalogianni
 Shadow Agriculture Minister - George Kasapidis
 Shadow Minister for Education and Religious Affairs - Aris Spiliotopoulos
 Shadow Justice Minister - Costas Tzavaras
 Shadow Alternate Justice Minister - Costas Karagounis
 Shadow Merchant Marine Minister - Yiannis Plakiotakis
 Shadow Minister for Media - Simos Kedikoglou
 Shadow Health Minister - Thanassis Yiannopoulos
 Shadow Alternate Health Minister - Gerassimos Yiakoumatos
 Parliamentary Representative - Nikos Dendias
 Party Spokesperson - Yiannis Mihelakis

References:

References

Greek shadow cabinets
2009 establishments in Greece
2012 disestablishments in Greece